Memorial High School is a public high school located in Frisco, Texas (USA) and is part of the Frisco Independent School District. The school opened in the 2018–19 school year.

History
Originally scheduled to open for the 2017–18 school year, Memorial High School's opening was delayed due to budget cuts, along with Lawler Middle School and Liscano and Talley elementary schools. Heritage, Lone Star, and Wakeland high schools were affected by crowding issues with larger classroom sizes, which were fixed with the opening of Memorial High School.

Namesake
Memorial High School is named in honor of those who serve others. The Frisco community has a rich history of people dedicating years of their lives in service to the community. The campus honors not only the veterans of our U.S. armed forces, but also all of the police officers, firefighters and other first responders who serve. The campus works to instill the qualities of its mascot, the Warrior, in students throughout the school year.

The student-designed artwork at the Memorial High School’s entrance expresses the sentiments of some of our country's past leaders and speaks to the bravery, sacrifice and strength required to keep a nation strong.

Athletics
The Memorial Warriors participate in the following sports: 
 Baseball
 Basketball
 Cross Country
 Football 
 Golf
 Powerlifting
 Soccer
 Softball
 Swimming and Diving
 Tennis
 Track and Field
 Volleyball
 Wrestling

2022 Memorial High School Senior Prank 
The Class of 2022 in Memorial High School had several members who conspired to create a devious prank which inflicted thousands of dollars of damage upon the school. A group of senior classmen got official approval for a sticky-note prank on the second to last day of school. They were supposed to place the sticky-notes on the walls of the school during the morning but instead overpowered the teachers and started spraying fire extinguishers in the school in addition to other damage-causing actions. This incident led to the cancellation of school for the last 2 days. Meanwhile, Memorial High School got a lot of local media coverage due to the incident.

References

External links

Educational institutions established in 2018
Frisco Independent School District high schools
High schools in Collin County, Texas
2018 establishments in Texas